The 2015 South Sydney Rabbitohs season is the 106th in the club's history. Coached by Michael Maguire and captained by  Greg Inglis, they are competing in the National Rugby League's 2015 Telstra Premiership.

Season summary

Squad List

Awards

Squad Positions

Squad Movement

Gains

Losses

Re-signings

2015 Tops

Appearances

Try Scores

Goal Kickers

Field Goal Kickers

Point Scores

Ladder

Fixtures

Pre-season

In 2015, the Rabbitohs again competed in three pre-season trial matches.

NRL Auckland Nines

The NRL Auckland Nines is a pre-season rugby league nines competition featuring all 16 NRL clubs. The 2015 competition was played over two days on 31 Jan and 1 Feb at Eden Park in Auckland, New Zealand. The Rabbitohs won the competition beating the Sharks in the grand final.

Regular season

Finals 2015

Player statistics

Representative Honours

References

South Sydney Rabbitohs seasons
South Sydney Rabbitohs season